The Hot Springs Range is a mountain range in Humboldt County, Nevada.

The range was named on account of the hot springs in the area.

References 

Mountain ranges of Nevada
Mountain ranges of Humboldt County, Nevada